Henry Paker is a British comedian and artist.

Paker has been described as “the man behind many of your favourite tv shows” with writing, performing and acting credits that include 8 Out of 10 Cats, Mock the Week, Comic Relief, Top Gear, Josh, Russell Howard’s Good News, Sean Walsh World and Michael Macintyre’s Big Show, as well as the BBC radio 4 sitcom ReincarNathan, Never Mind the Buzzcocks, Stand Up for the Week, Big Fat Quiz of the Year, and the Beef And Dairy Network Podcast, as well as the Josh Widdicombe and James Acaster presented show Hypothetical and BBC 1’s Would I Lie To You.

The comedian Ivo Graham declared Paker’s 2010 Edinburgh Festival Fringe show, which he described as a “surrealist maverick unreading the Bible”, as the funniest stand up he had ever seen. The Independent in 2010 saw “flashes of bonkers brilliance.. the real joy lies in the duo’s surreal flights of fancy” before it “descends into irredeemable silliness by the end” when reviewing The Golden Lizard which Paker wrote and performed with Mike Wozniak. The Golden Lizard, won Paker and Mike Wozniak the Best New Show at the Leicester Comedy Festival in 2011.

Paker’s one liner “Are headphones getting bigger or are idiots getting smaller?” made The Guardian best 10 joke list from the 2016 Edinburgh Festival, as well as a selection in The Daily Telegraph. Paker had also previously made The Guardian’s list in 2014. In 2014 fellow comedian Romesh Ranganathan described Paker as “a genius.. funny falls out of him.”

Paker’s 2018 Edinburgh show Man Alive was described as a “introverts manifesto” that “exceeds expectations in a wonderfully imaginative way” in The Times with Paker proving to be “a grandmaster at the pull-back-and-reveal”. The show was directed by his wife Amy Beth Hayes.

Three Bean Salad 
Paker is a member of the Three Bean Salad podcast with fellow comics Benjamin Partridge and Mike Wozniak. The podcast was described as having an “RP-accented vibe” by The Times, with the comics “meandering off the point of a different topic each week”. The podcast has had occasional live shows such as at the London Podcast Festival in 2021.

Illustrations 
As an illustrator, Paker was said by The Guardian to have “charmingly” provided the illustrations for Adam Kay’s book Anatomy as well as Kay’s follow up Kay's Marvellous Medicine: A Gross and Gruesome History of the Human Body, which was nominated for the Children's Non-fiction Book of the Year Award at the British Book Awards. Paker co-wrote and illustrated the book ‘Why Steve Was Late: 101 Exceptional Excuses for Terrible Timekeeping’ with Dave Skinner with whom he also wrote Don't Arm Wrestle a Pirate, which was made into animations voiced by Steve Coogan. Paker’s illustrations have appeared in The Spectator, The Observer and Prospect (magazine).

References

British stand-up comedians
21st-century British people

Living people

Year of birth missing (living people)